Anshen and Allen was an international architecture, planning and design firm headquartered in San Francisco with offices in Boston, Columbus, and London. The firm was ranked eighth for sustainable practices, and nineteenth overall in the "Architect 50" published by Architect magazine in 2010. They also ranked twenty-eighth in the top "100 Giants" of Interior Design 2010.

History 
Anshen and Allen was founded by Samuel Robert "Bob" Anshen (1910-1964) and William Stephen "Steve" Allen Jr. (1912-1992) in San Francisco in 1940. Anshen was born in Revere, Massachusetts, in 1910 to Louis Joseph Anshen and Sarah Jaffee, both of whom were Jewish immigrants from Eastern Europe. At the time of his birth, they owned a jewelry shop and were prosperous enough to afford a servant. Allen was born in Neptune Township, New Jersey, in 1912.

Their relationship began while they were studying at the University of Pennsylvania School of Architecture. Upon graduation, they both received a traveling fellowship that eventually led them to San Francisco in 1937.

Their first project was the Davies House, a  Tudor Gothic inspired mansion in Woodside, California, commissioned by Ralph K. Davies, a senior vice-president of Standard Oil of California. The house was completed on November 30, 1941.  After the end of World War II, as a generalist practice, the firm developed gas station prototypes for Standard Oil, parking garages and interior naval architecture.

Joseph Eichler and John Calder Mackay, both residential real estate developers, commissioned Anshen and Allen to build the initial Eichler homes and Mackay Homes in the California Modernist style beginning in the 1950s. The firm continued to build tract housing until 1962.

In the late 1970s and early 1980s, under the leadership of Derek Parker, the firm was transformed into a modern international architectural practice.

During the mid-2000s, Anshen and Allen adopted the use of Building Information Modeling (BIM). In 2007, Anshen and Allen participated in the development of Integrated Project Delivery by serving on the IPD Definition Task Group of the American Institute of Architects (AIA) California Council.

Anshen and Allen used shipping containers in their design for clinics for Containers 2 Clinics (C2C), a nonprofit organization that provides access to healthcare for women and children in rural areas.

In 2009 the firm was identified as specializing in sustainable designs for the healthcare and academic markets.

Anshen and Allen was acquired by Stantec in 2010.

Legacy
The Anshen and Allen papers are kept in the Environmental Design Archives at the University of California, Berkeley.

Selected projects 
 1950: Various Eichler Homes Developments Bay Area, California
 1956: Chapel of the Holy Cross, Sedona, Arizona, United States
 1957: Quarry Visitor Center, Dinosaur National Monument, Utah (razed)
 1961: 601 California Street, San Francisco, California
 1963: University of California, Berkeley, Latimer Hall, Berkeley, California
 1964: Central United Methodist Church, Stockton, California
 1965: Good Samaritan Hospital, San Jose, California
 1966: University of California, Berkeley, Samuel Silver Space Sciences Laboratory, Berkeley, California
 1966: University of California, Berkeley, Hildebrand Hall, Berkeley, California
 1967: Bank of California Building, San Francisco, California
 1968: University of California, Berkeley, Lawrence Hall of Science, Berkeley, California
 1969: Bank of California Tower (now Union Bank Tower), Portland, Oregon
 1987: University of Nevada System - Claude Howard Administration Building; Reno, Nevada 
 1988: Clovis Community Hospital, Clovis, California
 1991: Stanford University Medical Center, Lucile Packard Children's Hospital, Palo Alto, California
 1993: Stanford University, Green Earth Sciences Building, Palo Alto, California
 1993: University of California, Berkeley, Tang Center - Health Services Building, Berkeley, California
 1994: Children's Hospital, Ambulatory Services Building, Oakland, California
 1994: Stanford University, Landau Center for Economics and Policy Research, Palo Alto, California
 1998: Oregon Health and Science University, Doernbecher Children's Hospital, Portland, Oregon
 1998: Stanford University, Alway Building Genetics Department Lab, Palo Alto, California
 1999: Santa Clara Valley Medical Center Main Hospital and Specialty Center, San Jose, California
 1999: King's College, New Hunt's House, London, United Kingdom
 1999: Beijing Hospital, Inpatient Pavilion, Beijing, China
 2000: King's College, Franklin-Wilkins Building, London, United Kingdom
 2000: Seattle Children's, Pediatric and Infant Intensive Care Unit, Seattle, Washington
 2001: University of California, San Francisco Medical Center, Ambulatory Care Center, Radiology Clinic and Pediatrics Clinic, San Francisco, California
 2002: Norfolk and Norwich University Hospital, Norwich, United Kingdom
 2002: Asian Hospital and Medical Center, Filinvest, Alabang, Philippines
 2002: MESA Industries, MESA Women's Health Center, Ankara, Turkey
 2002: Diablo Valley College, Business and Language Building, Pleasant Hill, California
 2002: University of Kentucky, Ralph G. Anderson Engineering Building, Lexington, Kentucky
 2002: University of California, Berkeley, Hildebrand and Latimer Hall Seismic Upgrades, Berkeley, California
 2002: University of California, Davis, Contained Research Facility, Davis, California
 2003: Intermountain Healthcare, Dixie Regional Medical Center, St. George, Utah
 2003: Contra Costa County Regional Medical Center, Ambulatory Care Center, Martinez, California
 2003: California State University, Monterey Bay, Chapman Science Academic Center, Seaside, California
 2003: Occidental College, Hameetman Science Center, Los Angeles, California
 2004: Great Ormond Street Hospital for Children, New Botnar Building, London, United Kingdom
 2004: Great Ormond Street Hospital for Children, Weston House - Patient Hospital and Education Center, London, United Kingdom
 2004: Harvard University School of Dental Medicine, Research and Education Building, Boston, Massachusetts
 2004: University of Missouri, Life Sciences Center, Columbia, Missouri
 2004: De Anza College, Science Center, Cupertino, California
 2004: Royal Manchester Children's Hospital, Manchester, United Kingdom
 2005: University of Cambridge, Hutchison Cancer Research Centre, Cambridge, United Kingdom
 2006: Meyer Children's Hospital, Florence, Italy
 2006: University of Manchester, Sir Henry Wellcome Manchester Interdisciplinary Biocentre, Manchester, United Kingdom
 2006: University of California, Santa Cruz, Physical Sciences Building, Santa Cruz, California
 2006: University of North Carolina, Chapel Hill, Michael Hooker Research Center, Chapel Hill, North Carolina
 2006: University of Utah, Warnock Engineering Building, Salt Lake City, Utah
 2007: Kaiser Permanente Santa Clara Medical Center, Santa Clara, California
 2007: Fenway Community Health Center, Health Clinic, Boston, Massachusetts
 2007: Intermountain Healthcare, Intermountain Medical Center, Murray, Utah
 2008: PeaceHealth, Sacred Heart Medical Center at RiverBend, Springfield, Oregon
 2009: Newcastle upon Tyne Hospitals, Royal Victoria Infirmary, Newcastle, United Kingdom
 2009:  Stanford Hospitals & Clinics, Outpatient Center, Redwood City, California
 2009: City and County of San Francisco Department of Health, Laguna Honda Hospital Expansion, San Francisco, California
 2009: Palomar Pomerado Health, Palomar Medical Center and Pomerado Hospital, San Diego, California
 2010: Mills-Peninsula Health Services, Peninsula Medical Center, Burlingame, California
 2015: University of California, San Francisco Medical Center, Mission Bay Campus, San Francisco, California (Under construction)

Awards 
 Concrete Masonry Design Award, 2005
 Building Design & Construction Best AEC Firms to Work For, 2007
  Camden Building Quality Awards for Large Commercial - Octav Botnar Wing, Great Ormond Street Hospital, 2007
  Interior Design Best of Year Merit Award for Healthcare - Jon & Karen Huntsman Cancer Center, Intermountain Medical Center, 2007
  Interior Design Best of Year Merit Award for Education - Sir Henry Wellcome Manchester Interdisciplinary Biocentre, 2007
 International Interior Design Association Northern California Chapter Honor Award - Sir Henry Wellcome Manchester Interdisciplinary Biocentre, 2008
  Building Better Health Care Award for Best International Design - Intermountain Medical Center, 2008
  Building Better Health Care Award for Best Hospital Design - Northern Centre for Cancer Care and Renal Services Centre, The Freeman Hospital, 2008
  Building Better Health Care Judge's Special Award Highly Commended - The Bexley Wing, St. James's Institute of Oncology, St. James University Hospital, 2008
  U.S. Green Building Council's LEED Silver Certification for Columbus Office, 2009.
  American Society of Healthcare Engineering Vista Award for New Construction - Sacred Heart Medical Center at Riverbend, 2009
 Healthcare Environment Award for Ambulatory Care Facilities - Stanford Medicine Outpatient Center, 2010

References

External links 
 

 
Defunct architecture firms based in California
Companies based in San Francisco
Design companies established in 1940
Architecture in the San Francisco Bay Area
1940 establishments in California